Bancho may refer to:
Banchō, an area in Tokyo, Japan
Banchō (position), governmental position during the Ritsuryō period, or the leader of a group of delinquents